Dave McDermott (born 1974) is an American artist from Santa Cruz, California who currently lives and works in Brooklyn, NY. He earned his BFA from the Academy of Art College in San Francisco, and his MFA from Parsons School of Design in New York.

McDermott is primarily known for his work in painting and collage. His paintings are characterized by their use of cultural signifiers and a conspicuous focus on materials, often incorporating gold leaf, yarn, and wood relief alongside oil and canvas.

He is represented by Grimm in Amsterdam.

Solo exhibitions

Goethe’s Girlfriend
Brennan & Griffin—New York
March 2014–April 2014

The Power and Influence of Joseph Wiseman
Grimm—Amsterdam
November 2013–January 2014

Pleasure Centre
Twig—Brussels
October 2012–December 2012

Tot
Duve Berlin—Berlin
April–June 2012

A Rake’s Progress
Grimm—Amsterdam
March–May 2011

The Modern Temper
Duve Berlin—Berlin
January 2010–March 2011

Awards and recognition 
Zabludowicz Collection Artist in Residence, Sarvisalo, Finland (2010)

References

Links

Parsons School of Design alumni
Living people
American contemporary painters
21st-century American painters
1974 births
American male painters